PODi, the Digital Printing Initiative is an organization that helps set strategic direction in the digital print industry.

Membership – PODi members are industry leaders representing all facets of the digital printing ecosystem, including print and marketing service providers, enterprise marketers and manufacturers of software and hardware systems. PODi helps members integrate powerful digital technologies into their marketing, IT and management strategies. 

Members companies include EFI, Canon, HP, Kodak, PageFlex, Xerox,  and XMPie.  These and many more members have cooperated in the development of the PPML variable data language, and more broadly, digital print standards development worldwide.

PODi hosts the world's largest collection (over 500) of digital print case studies. Its annual conference, the AppForum, is the only independent thought leadership event expressly for the digital printing industry. Since the first event in 2002, AppForum has provided a unique platform for the digital printing community to come together, learn from people who are actually succeeding with variable data printing, print on demand, relevant marketing, cross media, web to print, QR Codes, augmented reality, and all the newest applications.

PODi also hosts educational webinars throughout the year, and has a growing toolbox of aids and training for the process used for selling the new, more profitable, applications.

PODi is managed by Caslon in North America and internationally. Other affiliates manage communities in the United Kingdom and Europe. Membership is open to all businesses who own a digital printing press, use digital printing as an integral part of their marketing plans, provide support to the industry, or have a passion for the opportunities and applications that digital printing is adding to the future of relevant marketing.

References

External links

Digital press